The 2021 WeatherTech 240 at The Glen was a sports car race sanctioned by the International Motor Sports Association (IMSA). The race was held at Watkins Glen International in Watkins Glen, New York on July 2, 2021. This race was the sixth round of the 2021 IMSA SportsCar Championship, and the third round of the 2021 WeatherTech Sprint Cup.

The race featured a 46-minute weather-enforced red flag period, and was won by the Whelen Engineering Racing duo of Pipo Derani and Felipe Nasr.

Background
The race was a late addition to the 2021 IMSA SportsCar Championship calendar, after travel restrictions related to the COVID-19 pandemic forced the cancellation of the round at Canadian Tire Motorsport Park for the second consecutive year. With the round scheduled for the July 4th weekend, the WeatherTech 240 was run less than a week after the 2021 6 Hours of The Glen, creating a veritable double header at Watkins Glen.

On June 30, 2021, IMSA released the latest technical bulletin outlining Balance of Performance for the event. The lone change occurred in DPi, where the Cadillac DPi-V.R received a one-liter fuel capacity increase after finishing fourth through seventh in class the previous weekend.

Entries

A total of 30 cars took part in the event, split across five classes. 6 cars were entered in DPi, 3 in LMP2, 6 in LMP3, 3 in GTLM, and 12 in GTD. The pre-event entry list featured 31 cars, but was reduced to the final tally of 30 following the #16 Wright Motorsports entry's withdrawal.

The only change from the previous round in DPi was the absence of Ally Cadillac Racing, while LMP2 saw a reduced three full-season entries after Era Motorsport announced their intention to scale back their 2021 program. The Michelin Endurance Cup entry from United Autosports was also absent, as was their entry in LMP3. BMW Team RLL's absence saw the return of the three-car GTLM field, while GTD featured a host of changes owing to the round only paying points towards the WeatherTech Sprint Cup. Pfaff Motorsports and Magnus Racing withdrew, as they had done at Detroit, while Gradient Racing and Compass Racing replaced them as part of their Sprint Cup-only campaigns. Gilbert Korthoff Motorsports also made their IMSA SportsCar Championship debut at this event, bringing the GTD class tally to 13.

Qualifying

Qualifying results

Results

References

External links

WeatherTech 240 at The Glen
WeatherTech 240 at The Glen
WeatherTech 240 at The Glen